Eelco Visser (12 October 1966 – 5 April 2022) was an Antoni van Leeuwenhoek Professor of Computer Science at Delft University of Technology.

Academic career 
Visser was born in Rijswijk. He received an MSc and Doctorate in Computer Science from the University of Amsterdam in 1993 and 1997, respectively. Previously he served as a Postdoc at the Oregon Graduate Institute from 1997 to 1998, as assistant professor at Utrecht University from 1998 to 2006, and as associate professor at TU Delft from 2006 to 2013.

Visser published over 100 publications in conferences and journals. His research included contributions to declarative syntax definition and parsing (SDF/SGLR), high-level definition of program transformations (Stratego/XT), language workbenches (Spoofax), modular language definition, domain-specific languages for web programming (WebDSL/mobl), and declarative models for (distributed) software deployment (Nix). He was the project leader of the NWO (Jacquard) projects TraCE, TFA, MoDSE, and PDS, which have produced several open source software systems used in research and industry. In 2013 he received the prestigious NWO VICI grant for research into verification of language definitions.

Visser was an active member of the programming languages community and served on many program committees of the important conferences in the field including OOPSLA, ECOOP, MODELS, SLE, and GPCE. At one time he was general chair of the ACM International Conference on Generative Programming and Component Engineering (GPCE 2010), and program chair of the International Conference on Model Transformation (ICMT 2011) and of Onward! 2011. He was member of the steering committees of SPLASH, Onward!, ICMT, and Generative Programming: Concepts & Experience (GPCE), and chaired the latter. He was founding member of the IFIP Working Groups 2.11 (Program Generation) and 2.16 (Language Design), and he served as chair of the latter. Eelco Visser had created program-transformation.org web site in 2000 for collecting, organizing and disseminating information about all aspects of Program transformation.

References

External links
 
 Google scholar profile
 program-transformation.org

1966 births
2022 deaths
Dutch computer scientists
Academic staff of the Delft University of Technology
University of Amsterdam alumni
Oregon Graduate Institute people
People from Rijswijk
20th-century Dutch scientists
21st-century Dutch scientists